The 1924 Lincoln Lions football team was an American football team that represented Lincoln University in the Colored Intercollegiate Athletic Association (CIAA) during the 1924 college football season. In their second year under head coach Ulysses S. Young, the Lions compiled a 7–0–1 record (5–0–1 against CIAA opponents), won the CIAA championship, shut out eight of nine opponents, and outscored all opponents by a total of 239 to 3. 

Key players included halfback Jazz Byrd, fullback Tommy Lee, and Bryd D. "Beno" Crudup, the team captain and right end.

Schedule

Notes

References

Lincoln
Lincoln Lions football seasons
Black college football national champions
Lincoln Lions football
College football undefeated seasons